Bad 25 is a 2012 documentary film about the 25th anniversary of Michael Jackson's 1987 album Bad. The film was directed by Spike Lee who previously directed Jackson in the music video for "They Don't Care About Us", as well as directing the posthumous music video for the song "This Is It". A 25th anniversary edition reissue of the Bad album was also released on September 18, 2012, sharing the same name as the film.

The film was first screened at the 69th Venice International Film Festival on August 31, 2012 and was shown for a limited time in New York and Los Angeles theaters on October 19, 2012. The film made its television premiere on German television channel VOX on October 20, 2012 and in the United Kingdom on BBC2 on December 1, 2012. A 90-minute edited version of the film, running for 64 minutes without commercials, premiered in North America on ABC on November 22, 2012. The film was released on Blu-ray and DVD on July 2, 2013. The film is also available on the iTunes Store.

Plot
The film includes behind the scenes clips of the recording session of Jackson's seventh studio album, Bad. It also features various people that had worked with Jackson during the Bad era (1986–1989) talking about the production of the album and the tour, acting or starring in some of Jackson's Bad singles and music videos including Sheryl Crow who was the duet partner with Jackson on the Bad World Tour for "I Just Can't Stop Loving You", Siedah Garrett, the original duet artist, talks about her experience with Jackson and many others. There are also interviews with influenced entertainers and artists.

Cast

 Michael Jackson - (archive footage)
 Glen Ballard
 Justin Bieber 
 Rubén Blades
 Jim Blashfield
 John Branca
 Miko C. Brando
 Questlove
 Chris Brown
 Ollie E. Brown
 Mariah Carey
 Colin Chilvers
 Andraé Crouch
 Sheryl Crow
 Jeffrey Daniel
 Matt Forger
 Siedah Garrett
 Nelson George
 CeeLo Green
 Andre Harrell
 Jerry Hey
 Jermaine Jackson - (archive footage)
 Quincy Jones - (archive footage)
 Jerry Kramer
 Karen Langford
 Vincent Paterson
 Greg Phillinganes
 Richard Price
 Joe Pytka
 L.A. Reid
 Seth Riggs
 John Robinson
 Thelma Schoonmaker
 Martin Scorsese
 Danyel Smith
 Larry Stessel
 Steve Stevens
 Bruce Swedien
 Tatiana Thumbtzen
 Will Vinton
 Joseph Vogel
 Kanye West
 Stevie Wonder
 Walter Yetnikoff
 Whitney Houston - (archive footage)

Home media
The film was released on Blu-ray and DVD on July 2, 2013. It can only be purchased through the store on Michael Jackson's official website. The documentary is also available on Apple TV.

References

External links

 

40 Acres and a Mule Filmworks films
American documentary films
Films directed by Spike Lee
Documentary films about Michael Jackson
2010s English-language films
2010s American films